This is a list of family relations in auto racing. The list includes drivers, pit personnel, team managers and team owners.

Siblings

Half-siblings

Parent-children

Spouses and domestic partners

Italics indicate dissolved relationship.

Grandparent-grandchildren

Uncle-nibling

Cousins

In-laws

References

External links
 Indianapolis 500 – Family Participation

Family relations
Auto racing
Incomplete sports lists
Motorsport families